Charlotte Bolette Sophie, Baroness Wedell-Wedellsborg  (27 January 1862 – 22 July 1953) was one of four women mathematicians to attend the inaugural International Congress of Mathematicians, held in Zurich in 1897.

At the time of the Congress, in 1897, she had just completed a doctorate at the University of Lausanne in Switzerland, with Adolf Hurwitz as an unofficial mentor. The subject of her dissertation was the application of elliptic functions to the construction of the Malfatti circles.

At the congress, Wedell was listed as being affiliated with the University of Göttingen. The other three women at the congress were Iginia Massarini, Vera von Schiff, and Charlotte Scott. None were speakers; the first Congress with a woman as a speaker was in 1912.

Wedell married engineer Eugène Tomasini in Copenhagen in 1898; they divorced in 1909.

References

1862 births
1953 deaths
Danish mathematicians
Danish women mathematicians
University of Lausanne alumni
Barons of Denmark
Danish expatriates in Switzerland
Wedel family